Parisis may refer to:

Pierre Louis Parisis, Roman Catholic bishop of the Bishopric of Langres from 1835 to 1851
Parisis, a synonym for the Pays de France region
Cormeilles-en-Parisis, a commune in the Île-de-France
The livre parisis (Paris livre (pound)), standard for minting French coins and a unit of account
 Parisis, a genus of coral